Bidabad (also Romanized as Bīdābād) is a village in Tolbozan Rural District, Golgir District, Masjed Soleyman County, Khuzestan Province, Iran. At the 2006 census, its population was 22, in 6 families.

References 

Populated places in Masjed Soleyman County